George Augustus Stallings Jr. (born March 17, 1948) is the founder of the Imani Temple African-American Catholic Congregation and was long active in the Black Catholic Movement. He served as a Catholic priest from 1974 to 1989, and was based in Washington, DC, for many years.

He established the Imani Temple as an independent denomination in 1989, making a public break in 1990 with the Catholic Church on The Phil Donahue Show. The Archbishop of Washington excommunicated him that year.

Early life and priestly ministry
Stallings was born in 1948 in New Bern, North Carolina, to George Augustus Stallings Sr., and Dorothy Smith. His grandmother, Bessie Taylor, introduced him as a boy to worship in a black Baptist church. He enjoyed the service so much that he said he wanted to be a minister. During his high school years, he began expressing "Afrocentric" sentiments, insisting on his right to wear a mustache, despite school rules, as a reflection of black identity.

To prepare for the priesthood, he attended St. Pius X Seminary in Kentucky and received a BA degree in philosophy in 1970. Sent by his bishop to the Pontifical North American College in Rome, he earned three degrees from the Pontifical University of Saint Thomas Aquinas between 1970 and 1975: the Bachelor of Sacred Theology (S.T.B.), a master's degree in pastoral theology, and a Licentiate of Sacred Theology (S.T.L.).
	
Stallings was ordained a priest in 1974. His first assignment was as an associate pastor at Our Lady of Peace Church, Washington, D.C. In 1976, at the age of 28 and two years after ordination, he was named a pastor of St. Teresa of Avila parish in Washington. He was the pastor of this church for 14 years. During Stallings' pastorate, the parish become known for its integration of African-American culture and gospel music in the Mass. He was active in the Black Catholic Movement and promoted the integration of African-American culture into Catholicism.

In 1985, Stallings secretly bought a private home in Anacostia in violation of the archdiocese rule requiring priests to live in the parish rectory. The Washington Post reported that Stallings had allegedly misused parish funds to renovate his Anacostia house. In 1988, he was transferred to a new position as a diocesan evangelist.

Departure and excommunication from the Catholic Church
In the late 1980s, Stallings made numerous appearances in the news media. He was interviewed on The Oprah Winfrey Show, Larry King Live, The Phil Donahue Show and The Diane Rehm Show. By 1989, Stallings had announced he was leaving to found a new ministry, the Imani Temple African-American Catholic Congregation. He stated that he left because the Catholic Church did not serve the African-American community or recognize talent. 

In January 1990, Stallings announced on The Phil Donahue Show that he was breaking with papal authority and giving up Catholic teaching on abortion, contraception, homosexuality, and divorce. Thirteen days prior, Archbishop James Hickey of Washington had ordered him to seek psychiatric treatment, following incidents of insubordination, allegations of sexual abuse of children and homosexual relationships. Additionally, Hickey saw Stallings' lifestyle as extravagant and possibly funded by donations to the church. Following the founding of Imani Temple, Hickey excommunicated Stallings and any Catholics remaining in the Imani Temple movement. 

Stallings was consecrated a bishop in May 1990 by Richard Bridges, a bishop of the Independent Old Catholic Church (not in communion with the Holy See). In 1991, Bridges's group conferred upon Stallings the title of archbishop.

Accusations of sexual misconduct
In 1989, The Washington Post reported that a former altar boy at St. Teresa of Avila Church accused Stallings of sexual misconduct over a period of several months in 1977. Stallings said "I am innocent", declining to answer questions. In a follow-up series of three articles in 1990, Post reporters Bill Dedman and Laura Sessions Stepp reported that concerns about Stallings' association with teenage boys had contributed to his split from the Roman Catholic Church. Stallings' former pastoral assistant, who was 22 at the time, spoke publicly about having a two-year sexual relationship with him.

In 2009 the archdiocese reached a $125,000 settlement with Gamal Awad, who said he was sexually abused at the age of 14 by Stallings and a seminarian in 1984.

Politics
Stallings made his first leap into politics when he announced for the Ward 6 D.C. Council seat in December 1996. Stallings ran under the nationalist-oriented Umoja Party. He received eighteen percent of the vote.

Relationship with Emmanuel Milingo and Sun Myung Moon
In the year 2001, the 53-year-old Stallings married Sayomi Kamimoto, a 24-year-old native of Okinawa, Japan, in a ceremony in New York City presided over by Sun Myung Moon, the founder of the Unification Church. Emmanuel Milingo, a former Catholic archbishop who was excommunicated, married a woman from South Korea at the same mass ceremony. Members of the Imani Temple were so upset by Stallings' sudden announcement of his upcoming wedding that some left after services in protest of his "close affiliation with and adoption of doctrine of the Unification Church". In addition, followers of the Imani faith have expressed being offended by Stallings' recent comments about black women.

In 2004 Stallings was a key organizer for an event in which Moon was crowned with a "crown of peace". The event was attended by a number of members of the U.S. Congress, a number of whom said that they were misled. It was held at the Dirksen Senate Office Building, the use of which requires a senator's approval. Stallings said the matter of who approved access was "shrouded in mystery".

Stallings was national co-president of the American Clergy Leadership Conference, an affiliate of Moon's Unification Church, and active in efforts to widen Moon's influence among black clergy. He regained attention in 2006 due to his association with excommunicated Catholic archbishop Emmanuel Milingo and his group Married Priests Now!. Milingo consecrated Stallings and three other independent Catholic bishops conditionally in a ceremony in September of that year.

Stallings is also active in the "Middle East Peace Initiative", which promotes conflict resolution between Israeli Jews and Palestinian Muslims.

Works
 I Am ... Living in the Rhythm of the God Within the Key of G Minor (2003, SKS Press).

See also
 Imani Temple African-American Catholic Congregation

References

External links

1948 births
Clergy of historically African-American Christian denominations
People excommunicated by the Catholic Church
African-American Roman Catholic priests
American Roman Catholic priests
Living people
People from New Bern, North Carolina
Catholics from North Carolina
African-American religious leaders
African-American Christian clergy
African-American Christianity
African-American Christians
African-American Roman Catholicism
21st-century African-American people
20th-century African-American people